Adrian Andermatt (born March 7, 1969) is a retired butterfly and freestyle swimmer from Switzerland. He is best known for winning the bronze medal in the men's 200 m butterfly at the 1996 European SC Championships in Rostock, alongside France's David Abrard.

References
 

1969 births
Living people
Swiss male butterfly swimmers
Swiss male freestyle swimmers